Kwara State Polytechnic is a Nigerian tertiary institution that was established in 1973 by the then Military Governor of Kwara State Col. David Bamigboye after the decision of establishing a polytechnic in Kwara State was announced in 1971. It is located in Ilorin, the capital of Kwara State.

History
Kwara State Polytechnic started with 110 pioneering students, and it offers National Diploma and Higher National Diploma in courses at undergraduate levels.

The College eventually came into existence following the promulgation of Kwara State Edict no. 4 of 1972 (now overtaken by the edict no. 21 of 1984 edict No. 13 of 1987 and edict no. 7 of 1994) as a body empowered by statute "to provide for studies, training, research and development of techniques in arts and language, applied sciences, engineering, management and commerce, education and well as in other spheres of learning".

The Kwara State Polytechnic formally commenced operation in January 1973 with an administrative machinery patterned closely after the existing universities in the country.

Rectors
Below is the list of Rectors from inception:

On 27 October 2019, Kwara State Polytechnic got a new Rector following the approval of the Kwara state Governor AbdulRahman AbdulRazaq. The Rector, Engr. Dr Abdul Jimoh Mohammed Succeeded Alhaji Mas'ud Elelu whose tenure ended in June, 2019.

Dr Abdul Jimoh Mohammed was until his appointment Deputy Rector (Academics) at the Federal Polytechnic Offa, Kwara State. He holds two doctorate degrees, including one in Metallurgical and Material Science from Witwatersrand University South Africa in 2016.

See also
 List of polytechnics in Nigeria

References

Universities and colleges in Nigeria
1973 establishments in Nigeria
Educational institutions established in 1973
Education in Kwara State
Ilorin